KMG is a Dutch company manufacturing amusement rides, located in Neede, Gelderland. KMG has constructed over 300 rides to date.

The following, among others, are KMG rides:

Afterburner (sold under the name Fireball in the US), a Pendulum ride.
Discovery
Discovery v2.0
Freak Out
Speed
Experience
XXL
Fun Factory
Tango
X-Factory (Miami)
Speed Buzz
High Swing
Experience
Move It 32
Move It 24 (smaller version of the Move It 32)
Move It 18
Para Jump (Discontinued)
Tropical Trip
Swing It
Inversion 12
XLR8
Sicko
Mission Space
Inversion 24 (known as Infinity)
Surf Ride
Speed 32 (A 65 meter speed using the A Frame of a XXL)
X-Drive

Accident
In July 2017, the Fire Ball ride broke apart at the Ohio State Fair, resulting in one death and seven injuries. Following the incident, the operator of the fair ride, Amusements of America, settled multiple lawsuits with the victims of the incident, including settlements for 1.7 million and 1.3 million dollars. As of 2019, an additional lawsuit against KMG has been filed by the victims, alleging that the ride manufacturer concealed a catastrophic defect that led to the tragedy.

References 

Amusement ride manufacturers
Manufacturing companies of the Netherlands
Companies based in Gelderland
Berkelland